

This is a list of the National Register of Historic Places listings in Knox County, Tennessee.

This is intended to be a complete list of the properties and districts on the National Register of Historic Places in Knox County, Tennessee, United States. Latitude and longitude coordinates are provided for many National Register properties and districts; these locations may be seen together in a map.

There are 116 properties and districts listed on the National Register in the county, including 1 National Historic Landmark.  Another 5 properties were once listed but have been removed.

History

The earliest settlers in what is now Knox County were Native Americans - the Indian mound is the primary "built structure" that remains from their era. Beginning with explorer Hernando de Soto, who traveled near the county, the earliest Europeans were not settlers but explorers and hunters who left no permanent structures. However, when North Carolina made land available in the Land Grab Act of 1783, early settlers began surveying the region. These men included General James White, who soon owned the land that became downtown Knoxville, as well as Frances Alexander Ramsey and Alexander McMillan.

James White settled in rural east Knox County on the French Broad River in 1785, but constructed a cabin in what is now downtown Knoxville in 1786. General White later requested that his son-in-law, Charles McClung, survey the land around his cabin and lay out sixteen blocks with four lots on each block. After setting aside lots for his residence, a cemetery, college and other functions he deemed necessary, the balance of the lots were sold by lottery on October 3, 1791. In 1792, the community began to take shape: 1) Knox County, Tennessee, was split off from Hawkins County, Tennessee; 2) settlers were constructing buildings on lots they received in the lottery; 3) Samuel and Nathan Cowan opened the first store; and 4) the first tavern was opened by John Chisholm. In 1793, a garrison of soldiers was assigned to protect the settlers.

Other than setting aside land for Blount College (now the University of Tennessee), the earliest structures were built to accommodate basic frontier needs. These included the fort, residences, churches, taverns (which also served as inns) and a cemetery.

In terms of growth, development of the county was due both to expansion of the early settlement (a) and the development of roads (b), which linked James White's Fort to other parts of the state: (a) The original 16 square blocks was expanded to accommodate growth in the population. Moses White, James White's son, laid out East Knoxville, which was originally a separate city and called Mechanicsburg. Colonel John Williams laid out the west end of the town, which was briefly known as Williamsburg; and (b) Roads were constructed to allow access both to surrounding settlements in rural areas of Knox County, and to allow pioneers to travel from the east coast further west. Settlers typically traveled down from southwest Virginia through Rogersville, Tennessee on the Knoxville Road before arriving at Knoxville. By 1795, what is now Kingston Pike went from James White's Fort to the western end of the county. Beyond the western end of the county, this route became known as the Nashville Road. By 1807, the Knoxville Gazette reported that 200 settlers a day were passing through the city on their way further west. Further north in Knox County, Adair's Fort, built by John Adair in Fountain City, protected settlers traveling westward on the Emory Road. And by 1792, Alexander Cunningham was operating the first ferry over the Tennessee River south of Knoxville.

Despite ceasing to be Tennessee's state capital in 1817, Knoxville continued to grow slowly through the antebellum period. And due to the mountainous terrain, slavery never took root as deeply in East Tennessee as it did in Middle Tennessee and West Tennessee. The valleys of East Tennessee, such as the area west of Knoxville accessed by Kingston Pike, did have plantations, a few of whose houses still remain. And the Tennessee River was not as navigable at Knoxville as it was further downstream, so, other than the roads, the city remained comparatively isolated until the railroads reached the city in 1855. Then, due to Knoxville's central location in the southeast and the railroads that traversed it, the city experienced explosive growth. Initially, the East Tennessee & Virginia Railroad (which soon became the East Tennessee, Virginia and Georgia Railroad, and later became part of Southern Railway) began operations in the city. The Louisville and Nashville Railroad soon followed, giving Knoxville access to two prominent transportation companies and two rail stations of architectural significance. The 1880s were the greatest growth period in the city's history, although there was substantial growth after World War II.

Structures now listed on the National Register of Historic Places largely reflect this expansion. There were isolated pockets of settlement, such as the Ramsey House and Marble Springs, in what remains the rural part of the county. As Kingston Pike developed, Crescent Bend and other estates were constructed in what soon became affluent western Knox County. Kingston Pike also linked Bearden, Ebenezer's Mill, and later linked Farragut, Concord and Kingston to Knoxville. There was a flurry of commercial and residential development in the late 19th century. As electric streetcars began operation, suburban expansion moved both north and south. Automobiles allowed further urban sprawl to develop.

As the county has expanded, many historic structures have been lost to development. Examples include: 18th-century Chisholm Tavern, which was not demolished until the 20th century as part of the construction of James White Parkway; the Mabry Hood House on Kingston Pike, which was demolished to allow construction of Pellissippi Parkway; and the Baker Peters House on Kingston Pike, which has survived, but has been stripped of its context due to surrounding commercial development, including a carwash in its front yard. By 1900, all that remained of James White's Fort was the fort's main house, which itself was dismantled and moved to a farm outside the city in 1906. In the 1960s, preservation groups moved the house to its present location on Hill Avenue, and reconstructed its historic palisades and outbuildings. Because it has been moved from its original location, the fort is not eligible for listing on the National Register.

Current listings

|}

Former listings

|}

See also

 History of Knoxville, Tennessee
 List of National Historic Landmarks in Tennessee
 National Register of Historic Places listings in Tennessee

References

Further reading
 Ash, Stephen V. Past Times : A Daybook of Knoxville History. Knoxville News-Sentinel, 1991.
 Barber, John W., and Howe, Henry. All the Western States and Territories, . . .  (Cincinnati, Ohio:  Howe's Subscription Book Concern, 1867). pp. 631–632.
 Deaderick, Lucille. Heart of the Valley: A History of Knoxville, Tennessee. (East Tennessee Historical Society, 1976).
 Folmsbee, Stanley J. and Lucile Deaderick. The Founding of Knoxville. (East Tennessee Historical Society, 1941.)
 History of Tennessee from the Earliest Time to the Present: Together With an Historical and a Biographical Sketch of From Twenty-Five to Thirty Counties of East Tennessee.  (The Goodspeed Publishing Co., Chicago, Nashville, 1887.)
 Hooper, Ed. Images of America: Knoxville. (Arcadia Publishing, 2003).
 Humes, Thomas W. The Half-Century of Knoxville: Being the Address and Proceedings at the Semi-Centennial Anniversary of the Settlement of the Town, February 10, 1842. To which is added an appendix: containing a number of historical documents. (Printed at the Register Office, Knoxville, Tennessee, 1852).
 Isenhour, Judith Clayton. Knoxville, A Pictorial History. (Donning Company, 1978, 1980).
 Knoxville: Fifty Landmarks. (Knoxville: The Knoxville Heritage Committee of the Junior League of Knoxville, 1976).
 Powell, Lyman Pierson, editor. Historic Towns of the Southern States.  (G. P. Putnam, New York, London, 1900).
 Rothrock, Mary U., editor. The French Broad-Holston Country: A History of Knox County, Tennessee. (Knox County Historical Committee; East Tennessee Historical Society, 1946).
The Future of Knoxville's Past: Historic and Architectural Resources in Knoxville, Tennessee  (Knoxville Historic Zoning Commission, October, 2006)

External links
National Register of Historic Places
  City of Knoxville: History
  Knoxville Civil War Sites
 Knoxville MPC Historic Structures Information
 TNGenWeb Knox County History
 Library of Congress - Historic Buildings Survey: Knox County
 Restore Knoxville Website: Neighborhoods
 city-data.com:  Knoxville History
 State of Tennessee: East Tennessee Civil War Sites
  Knoxville Museum of Art

History of Knoxville, Tennessee
Knox